Bim is an unincorporated community and coal town in Boone County, West Virginia, United States. The Bim Post Office opened in 1923.

The community was named after Bim Gump, a cartoon character.

References

Unincorporated communities in Boone County, West Virginia
Unincorporated communities in West Virginia
Coal towns in West Virginia